The Corridor is a 1995 Lithuanian drama film directed by Šarūnas Bartas. It has a fragmentary narrative without dialogue and depicts several people in Vilnius. According to the director, the title symbolizes "the atmosphere of a corridor between yesterday and today, containing many doors".

The film was shown in the Panorama section of the 45th Berlin International Film Festival. It won the Fipresci Prize at the 1995 Vienna International Film Festival.

Cast
 Yekaterina Golubeva
 Viacheslav Amirhanian
 Šarūnas Bartas
 Eimuntas Nekroshius
 Mantvydas Janeliunas
 Yurga Karauskaite
 Daiva Ksivickiene
 Eimuntas Nekrošius

Reception
David Stratton of Variety wrote: "The camera lingers on various characters, including a youth played by the director, who just sit or stand about, looking miserable. Nothing much happens. ... Whatever Bartas was trying to communicate in The Corridor is difficult to determine, and maybe only the initiated can work it out."

References

1995 films
Films directed by Šarūnas Bartas
Films set in Lithuania
Lithuanian drama films
Lithuanian-language films
Vilnius in fiction